Bruce Carson is the name of:

 Bruce Carson, a former adviser to Canadian Prime Minister Stephen Harper
 Bruce Carson, a minor character in the sixth season of 24
Bruce Carson (screenwriter) of Slumber Party Massacre III
Bruce Carson, character played by Gary Tomlin